On the Wheels of Solid Steel is a DJ mix album, mixed by DJ Kentaro for the Solid Steel mix series.

Track listing
 "Intro" - DJ Kentaro
 "Animal Chin" - Jaga Jazzist
 "King's Lyn" - Wagon Christ
 "Family" - Animals on Wheels
 "Brasilia Freestylee" - Clifford Gilberto Rhythm Combination
 "Scratch Yer Hed (Squarepusher Mix)" - DJ Food
 "Border"  (featuring Silent Poets) - Coldcut
 "Timber (DK Recut)" - Coldcut
 "The Terrorist" (featuring Moshun Man) - DJ Vadim
 "8 Point Agenda (Version 2)" (featuring Latyrx) - The Herbaliser
 "Chicken Spit" - Pest
 "Up To Jah" (featuring Demolition Man) - DJ Vadim
 "Centre Of The Earth" - DJ Food
 "Give It Up" - Coldcut
 "Heard Yer Bird Moved In" - Pest
 "Deux Aus De Maia" - Wagon Christ
 "Sopping Shitty" - Wagon Christ
 "Dark Lady" - DJ Food
 "No Mind (The Zen Experience)" - Happy Campers
 "The Great Drive By (Flying Fish Remix)" - Funki Porcini
 Atomic Moog (Cornelius Mix)" - Coldcut

Promo DVD content
 Intro - Shuriken Cut
 Loop (Daigakuin Multi Angle)
 Tokyo Solid Steel Tour 28 Jan 2005 - Live At Unit
 On The Wheels Of Solid Steel - Animation & DVJ "Visusratch" Mix by DJ Kentaro
 Credits

DJ mix albums
2005 compilation albums
2005 video albums
Ninja Tune compilation albums
Ninja Tune video albums